Charles Kelly may refer to:

 Charles Kelly (American football), American football coach
 Chip Kelly (Charles Edward Kelly, born 1963), American football coach
 Charles Kelly (footballer) (1894–1969), footballer who played in the Football League for Tranmere Rovers and Stoke
 Charles Kelly (historian) (1889–1971), American historian and superintendent of Capitol Reef National Park
 Charles A. Kelly (died 1962), American murderer; last person executed by Iowa
 Charles E. Kelly (cartoonist) (1902–1981), Irish cartoonist and founder of the magazine Dublin Opinion
 Charles E. Kelly (soldier) (1920–1985), United States Army soldier and recipient of the United States Medal of Honor
 Charles H. Kelly (1833–1911), president of the Methodist Conference in 1889 and 1905
 Charles L. Kelly (died 1964), United States Army helicopter pilot during the Vietnam War

See also
Charlie Kelly (disambiguation)
Charles Kelley, lead singer and founding member of country music band Lady A